February 15, 1839 is a 2001 Quebec historical drama film. Directed by Pierre Falardeau, it is about the incarceration at the Pied-du-Courant Prison and the execution by hanging there of Patriote participants of the Lower Canada Rebellion. Those rebels sought to make Lower Canada, now Quebec, a republic independent from the British Empire.

It features as characters the historical figures François-Marie-Thomas Chevalier de Lorimier, his wife Henriette and Charles Hindelang.

Synopsis
In the aftermath of the failed 1837–38 rebellion in Lower Canada, 800 rebels are held in the Prison de Montréal. The film opens on February 14, 1839, the day when leader Marie Thomas Chevalier De Lormier (Luc Picard) and his comrade-in-arms (Frédéric Gilles) are told they will be hanged in 24 hours. Director Pierre Falardeau makes no doubt about where his sympathies lie, but the film is as much about human beings confronting death as it is polemic, and there are tender scenes when De Lormier's wife (Sylvie Drapeau) visits him one last time. 
Pierre Falardeau said that Telefilm Canada approved Michel Brault's 1999 movie Quand je serai parti... vous vivrez encore as an excuse to initially deny funds for 15 février 1839.

Release and awards
It released in the United States by Lionsgate on January 26, 2001. It won four Prix Jutra for Actor (Luc Picard), Supporting Actress (Sylvie Drapeau), Art Direction and Sound.

Critical acclaims 
"It’s certainly not the masterpiece some indépendantiste viewers see in the film, but it’s also not the insufferable, propagandistic dreck various English-language critics accuse it of being." – Maurie Alioff, Take One: Film in Canada

Cast 
Luc Picard - François-Marie-Thomas Chevalier de Lorimier
Sylvie Drapeau - Henriette De Lorimier
Frédéric Gilles - Charles Hindelang
Denis Trudel - Jacques Yelle
Julien Poulin - Curé Marier
Yvon Barrette - Osias Primeau

See also 
Patriote movement
Quebec nationalism
Quebec independence movement
History of Quebec
Timeline of Quebec history

References

External links

2001 films
Quebec films
Films set in 1839
Lower Canada Rebellion war films
British Empire war films
2000s war drama films
Films set in Montreal
Canadian films based on actual events
Lionsgate films
Canadian war drama films
Films directed by Pierre Falardeau
2001 drama films
2000s French-language films
French-language Canadian films
2000s Canadian films